Here's to the Mourning is the fifth studio album by American rock band Unwritten Law, released in 2005 by Lava Records. Much of the lyrics on the album were co-written by singer/songwriter Aimee Allen. She and singer Scott Russo soon began a romantic relationship and formed the side project Scott & Aimee. Allen and Linda Perry contributed to the writing of the album's lead single "Save Me (Wake Up Call)," which reached #5 on US modern rock charts. Overall the album reached #51 on the Billboard 200, becoming the highest-ranking album of the band's career.  Songs featured in racing games include “Celebration Song”, which is featured on MX vs. ATV Unleashed and Need for Speed: Underground 2. and "F.I.G.H.T" which is featured on Burnout Revenge and Midnight Club 3: Dub Edition.

When the band began to record the album they were without a drummer (founding drummer Wade Youman had been expelled from the band in 2003, though he would return 10 years later). They were joined in the studio by Adrian Young of No Doubt and Tony Palermo of Pulley who filled in on drums for the recording. The band got along so well with Palermo that by the time of the album's release he had joined as their permanent drummer and remain with them for four years. Here's to the Mourning was also the band's last album with rhythm guitarist Rob Brewer, who was ejected from the group in March 2005, a month after the album's release.

Track listing

Personnel

Band
Scott Russo - lead vocals
Steve Morris - lead guitar, backing vocals
Rob Brewer - rhythm guitar, backing vocals
Pat "PK" Kim - bass guitar
Tony Palermo - drums

Additional musicians
Adrian Young - drums
John Krovoza - cello on "Walrus"
Tom Vos - violin on "Walrus"
Ben Rosen - programming

Production
Sean Beavan – producer, engineer, mixing
Josh Abraham – producer of "Celebration Song" and "Because of You" (with Beavan)
Linda Perry – producer of "Save Me (Wake Up Call)" (with Beavan)
Critter and Zach Barnhorst – engineers
Zach Barnhorst, Jay Groin, James Murray, and Alex Pavlides – assistant engineers
Brain Gardener – mastering
John Michael Gill - Cover Artist, Graphics

Charts
Album

Singles

References

Unwritten Law albums
2005 albums
Albums produced by Josh Abraham
Albums produced by Linda Perry